Quensel is a surname. Notable people with the surname include:

 Carl-Erik Quensel (1907–1977), Swedish statistician and demographer 
 Conrad Quensel (1767-1806), Swedish naturalist
 Isa Quensel (1905-1981), Swedish actress and opera singer 
 Nils Quensel (1894–1971), Swedish cabinet minister involved in the "Kejne affair"
 Percy D. Quensel, Swedish geologist

See also
 Quensel Glacier, Cooper Bay, South Georgia
 Quesnel (disambiguation)